Fabio Maistro (born 5 April 1998) is an Italian footballer who plays as a midfielder for  club SPAL.

Club career

Fiorentina 
Maistro is a product of the Fiorentina youth system, and featured for their Under-19 squad during the 2015–16 and 2016–17 seasons. During the 2016–17 Serie A season, he also appeared on the bench for the senior squad numerous times, but never saw the pitch. He was released by Fiorentina at the end of the season.

Gavorrano 
On 25 January 2018, Maistro joined Serie C club Gavorrano as a free-agent; three days later, he made his professional debut as a substitute, replacing Giulio Favale in the 63rd minute of a 1–1 away draw against Robur Siena. On 25 February, he played his first entire match for Gavorrano, a 1–0 away defeat against Arzachena.

Rieti 
On 20 July 2018, he signed with another Serie C club, Rieti.

Lazio

Loan to Salernitana
On 3 August 2019, he signed with Lazio and was immediately loaned to Salernitana for a season.

Loan to Pescara
On 14 September 2020 he joined Pescara on loan.

Loan to Ascoli
On 31 August 2021, he was loaned to Ascoli.

SPAL
On 19 July 2022, Maistro signed a three-year contract with SPAL.

International career 
Maistro made his debut with the Italy U21 side on 16 November 2019, coming on as a late substitute for Patrick Cutrone in a 3–0 home win against Iceland in a Euro 2021 qualifying match.

Career statistics

Club

References

External links 
 

1998 births
People from Rovigo
Footballers from Veneto
Living people
Italian footballers
Italy under-21 international footballers
Association football midfielders
ACF Fiorentina players
U.S. Gavorrano players
F.C. Rieti players
U.S. Salernitana 1919 players
Delfino Pescara 1936 players
Ascoli Calcio 1898 F.C. players
S.P.A.L. players
Serie B players
Serie C players
Sportspeople from the Province of Rovigo